The 2010–11 season of Schalke 04 began on 16 August 2010 with a DFB Pokal match against Aalen, and ended on 21 May 2011, the final of the DFB-Pokal, played against MSV Duisburg.

Transfers

Summer transfers

In:

Out:

Winter transfers

In:

Out:

Goals and appearances

|}
Last Updated: 21 May 2011

Competitions

Bundesliga

League table

Matches

Note: Results are given with Schalke 04 score listed first.

Notes
 The match on 1 April against St. Pauli was suspended in the 87th minute after an assistant referee was hit by a beer cup thrown from the stands with the score at 2–0 for Schalke. The DFB Sports Court awarded the match to Schalke maintaining the 2–0 scoreline as well as the goalscorers and disciplinary records.

UEFA Champions League

Group stage

Matches

Note: Results are given with FC Schalke 04 score listed first.

DFB-Pokal

Matches

Note: Results are given with FC Schalke 04 score listed first.

Final

Kits

See also
2010–11 Bundesliga
2010–11 DFB-Pokal
FC Schalke 04

References

Schalke 04 season 2010-11
FC Schalke 04 seasons
Schalke